Tudor is an unincorporated community in Sutter County, California, United States.

Notes

Unincorporated communities in Sutter County, California
Unincorporated communities in California